In the 2016–17 season, JS Saoura competed in the Ligue 1 for the 5th season, as well as the Algerian Cup.

Squad list
Players and squad numbers last updated on 18 November 2010.Note: Flags indicate national team as has been defined under FIFA eligibility rules. Players may hold more than one non-FIFA nationality.

Competitions

Overview

Ligue 1

League table

Results summary

Results by round

Matches

Algerian Cup

Champions League

Preliminary round

Squad information

Playing statistics

|-
! colspan=14 style=background:#dcdcdc; text-align:center| Goalkeepers

|-
! colspan=14 style=background:#dcdcdc; text-align:center| Defenders

|-
! colspan=14 style=background:#dcdcdc; text-align:center| Midfielders

|-
! colspan=14 style=background:#dcdcdc; text-align:center| Forwards

|-
! colspan=14 style=background:#dcdcdc; text-align:center| Players transferred out during the season

Goalscorers

Squad list
As of 15 January 2017.

Transfers

In

Out

Notes

References

2016-17
JS Saoura